Alfred Jones (born 1902; date of death unknown) was an English footballer who played in the English Football League for Crewe Alexandra and Stoke.

Career
Jones was born in Hanley, Staffordshire and started his career at Crewe Alexandra where he made five appearances in the Football League Third Division North. He then joined Congleton Town before moving to Stoke, where again he made five appearances, scoring once against Hull City in November 1924. At the end of the 1924–25 season he re-joined Congleton.

Career statistics 
Source:

References

Sportspeople from Hanley, Staffordshire
English footballers
Association football forwards
Port Vale F.C. players
Crewe Alexandra F.C. players
Stoke City F.C. players
Congleton Town F.C. players
English Football League players
1902 births
Year of death missing